RCSS may refer to:

 Real Canadian Superstore
 Restoration Council of Shan State
 Taipei Songshan Airport, by ICAO code
Rajagiri College of Social Sciences